is a railway station in Tara, Fujitsu District, Saga Prefecture, Japan. It is operated by JR Kyushu and is on the Nagasaki Main Line.

Lines

Station layout 
The station consists of a side and an island platform serving three tracks. A siding branches off track 1 and another off track 3. The station building is a timber built structure of western design and houses a waiting room and a ticket window. Access to the island platform is by means of a footbridge.

Management of the station has been outsourced to the JR Kyushu Tetsudou Eigyou Co., a wholly owned subsidiary of JR Kyushu specialising in station services. It staffs the ticket window which is equipped with a POS machine but does not have a Midori no Madoguchi facility.

Adjacent stations

History
Japanese Government Railways (JGR) built the station in the 1930s during the development of an alternative route for the Nagasaki Main Line along the coast of the Ariake Sea which was at first known as the Ariake Line. In the next phase of expansion, the track was extended to Tara which opened on 16 April 1934 as the new southern terminus. On 1 December 1934, the entire route was completed and through-traffic achieved from Hizen-Yamaguchi through the station to Nagasaki. The track was then redesignated as part of the Nagasaki Main Line. With the privatization of Japanese National Railways (JNR), the successor of JGR, on 1 April 1987, control of the station passed to JR Kyushu.

Passenger statistics
In fiscal 2016, the station was used by an average of 323 passengers daily (boarding passengers only), and it ranked 300th  among the busiest stations of JR Kyushu.

Environs
National Route 207

See also
 List of railway stations in Japan

References

External links
Tara Station (JR Kyushu)

Nagasaki Main Line
Railway stations in Saga Prefecture
Railway stations in Japan opened in 1934